Bou Mhel el-Bassatine is a town and commune in the Ben Arous Governorate, Tunisia. As of 2004 it had a total population of 27,977.

See also
List of cities in Tunisia

References

Populated places in Ben Arous Governorate
Communes of Tunisia
Tunisia geography articles needing translation from French Wikipedia